Peter Lin may refer to:
Peter H. Lin, American surgeon
Peter Lin (bishop) (born 1967), Australian Anglican bishop
Lin Chin-hsing (born 1953), Taiwanese politician
Lin Pin-kuan (born 1948), Taiwanese politician
Peter Lim (born 1953), Singaporean businessman
Peter Lim Swee Guan (c. 1947–1975), participant in the Gold Bars triple murders